Road Trip is the second and final album from American girl group Girl Authority. Unlike the first album, Road Trip is a mixture of cover songs and original songs performed by Girl Authority. Road Trip is also featured with a DVD, documenting a behind the scenes glance into the production of the album and the girls.

In the February, "Girl Talk" featuring "Urban Girl" Gina, she explains a few of the upcoming songs and the meaning behind the title of their second album.

Featured on this album is also a version of the early previously unreleased Depeche Mode song called "Let's Get Together" that Vince Clarke re-wrote for Girl Authority. Cyndi Lauper wrote "Shine", a ballad, featured on the album. Tanya Donelly wrote four tracks for the album, including the group's new signature song titled "This Is My Day". The album reached No. 30 on the Billboard Top Heatseekers chart and No. 10 on the Top Kid Audio chart. With the release of Road Trip, the group's EP, Halloween Party Songs was sold along with the album at iParty stores as a promotion.

Track listing 
 "Let's Get Together" (Vince Clarke) 2:53 
 "Holiday" (Curtis Hudson) 4:41 – Madonna
 "Life Is a Highway" (Tom Cochrane) 3:54 – Tom Cochrane
"Rhythm of the World" (Savan Kotecha, Nadir Khayat, Darryl Zero, Calanit Ledan) 3:44 – Ch!pz
 "We Are Family" (Nile Rodgers, Bernard Edwards) 3:42 – Sister Sledge
 "Reach" (Gloria Estefan, Diane Warren) 3:49 – Gloria Estefan
 "My Wild Side" (Andrea Wasse, Rob Wells, Christopher Ward) 2:56
 "This Is My Day" (Tanya Donelly) 3:10
 "The Loco-Motion" (Gerry Goffin, Carole King) 3:18  –  Little Eva, Grand Funk Railroad, Kylie Minogue
 "Vacation" (Charlotte Caffey, Kathy Valentine, Jane Wiedlin) 2:53 – The Go-Go's
 "Car Wash (Girl Authority Mix)" (Norman Whitfield) 3:50 – Rose Royce
 "Shine" (Cyndi Lauper, William Wittman) 4:08  – Cyndi Lauper
 "Walking On Sunshine" (Kimberley Rew) 3:51  – Katrina and the Waves
 "Here to Stay" (Christina Aguilera, Heather Noelle Holley, George Henry Jackson) 3:14  – Christina Aguilera
 "Dancin' in the Streets" (Ivy Hunter, Marvin Gaye, William Stevenson) 2:59 – Martha and the Vandellas
 "This One's for the Girls" (Chris Hunter, Hillary Lindsey, Aimee Mayo) 4:01  – Martina McBride
 "Perfect Day" (Timothy James Price, Antonio Armato) 3:30 – Hoku
 "Don't Stop" (Christine McVie) 3:29  – Fleetwood Mac
 "Girl Authority (Theme)" (Scott Billington, Steve Bonner) 3:35

Girl Authority albums
Covers albums
2007 albums
Zoë Records albums